

Introduction 
 
Caenorhabditis castelli is a species of Caenorhabditis nematodes, a member of the same genus as the model organism Caenorhabditis elegans. Within this genus, C. castelli belongs to the Drosophilae super-group, and Angaria group. This species is a close relative of C. angaria[2] and was referred to as “C. sp. 12” prior to 2014[3]. C. castelli was discovered from rotting Micropholis cayennensis fruit in the Nouragues Nature Reserve of tropical French Guiana in 2008[2]. It is one of the rarest species found in French Guiana[4].

Anatomy 
 
The mean body length of adult female C. castelli was measured to be 1212.24µm and for adult males, 827.61µm, which is comparable to the average male body size of the model organism C. elegans (824.74µm)[5].

Spicule shape 
The spicules of C. castelli males possess a short, stout, evenly curved, complex morphology, similar to other Caenorhabditis species within the Angaria and Drosophila groups[2].

Reproduction 
 
Like most species of Caenorhabditis, C. castelli demonstrates a gonochoristic, or male-female, mode of reproduction, as opposed to C. elegans and C. briggsae which demonstrate an androdioecious mode of reproduction, such that populations primarily include self-fertile hermaphrodites with more rare males[2]. Notably, C. castelli mates in a spiral mating style, where the male wraps around the female with its posterior end[6,7], a characteristic shared with other species in the Angaria group[2]. 

C. castelli males contain larger sperm cells (28.81µm2) on average compared to hermaphroditic Caenorhabditis species like C. elegans (19.55µm2), C. briggsae (18.65µm2) and C. tropicalis (19.81µm2)[5].

Hybridization  
In the lab, C. castelli can hybridize with C. angaria to produce sterile females and slow growing males[1]. Hybridization of C. castelli with C. quiockensis was attempted, but the two species failed to hybridize[7].

References 

2. Kiontke KC, Felix MA, Ailion M, Rockman MV, Braendle C, Penigault J-B, Fitch D (2011). “A phylogeny and molecular barcodes for Caenorhabditis, with numerous new species from rotting fruits”. BMC Evolutionary Biology. 11:339. https://doi.org/10.1186/1471-2148-11-339 

3. Felix M-A, Braendle C, Cutter AD (2014). “A streamlined system for species diagnosis in Caenorhabditis (Nematoda: Rhabditidae) with name designations for 15 distinct biological species”. PLOS ONE. 9: e94723. https://doi.org/10.1371/journal.pone.0094723 

4. Ferrari C, Salle R, Callemeyn-Torre N, Jovelin R, Cutter AD, Braendle C (2017). “Ephemeral-habitat colonization and neotropical species richness of Caenorhabditis nematodes”. BMC Ecology. 17(43). https://doi.org/10.1186/s12898-017-0150-z 

5. Vielle, A., Callemeyn-Torre, N., Gimond, C., Poullet, N., Gray, J. C., Cutter, A. D., & Braendle, C. (2016). “Convergent evolution of sperm gigantism and the developmental origins of Sperm size variability in Caenorhabditis nematodes”. Evolution. 70(11) http://dx.doi.org/10.1111/evo.13043 

6. Sudhaus W, Kiontke K, Giblin-Davis RM (2011). “Description of Caenorhabditis angaria n. sp. (Nematoda: Rhabditidae), an associate of sugarcane and palm weevils (Coleoptera: Curculionidae)”. Nematology. 13(1),61-78. http://dx.doi.org/10.1163/138855410X500334 

7. Sudhaus W, Kiontke K (2007). “Comparison of the cryptic nematode species Caenorhabditis brenneri sp. n and C. remanei (Nematoda: Rhabditidae) with the stem species pattern of the Caenorhabditis Elegans group. Zootaxa. 1456: 45-62. http://dx.doi.org/10.11646/zootaxa.1456.1.2 

8. Stevens et al. (2019). “Comparative genomics of 10 new Caenorhabditis species”. Evolution Letters. 3(2):217-236. https://doi.org/10.1002/evl3.110 

castelli
Nematodes described in 2014
Fauna of French Guiana